Adrien Duvillard (7 November 1934 – 14 February 2017) was a French alpine skier who competed in the 1956 Winter Olympics and 1960 Winter Olympics.

His son Adrien and his brother Henri Duvillard were also successful skiers.

At the 1956 Winter Olympics he finished 4th in the Giant Slalom, earning France's best result at those games.

References

External links
 

1934 births
2017 deaths
French male alpine skiers
Olympic alpine skiers of France
Alpine skiers at the 1956 Winter Olympics
Alpine skiers at the 1960 Winter Olympics